Kristina Mladenovic and Katarzyna Piter were the champions the last time the tournament was held in 2013, but chose not to participate this year.

Cornelia Lister and Renata Voráčová won the title, defeating Ekaterine Gorgodze and Arantxa Rus in the final, 7–6(7–2), 6–2.

Seeds

Draw

Draw

References

Sources
Main Draw

Internazionali Femminili di Palermo - Doubles
2019 Doubles